Histrelin acetate, sold under the brand names Vantas and Supprelin LA among others, is a nonapeptide analogue of gonadotropin-releasing hormone (GnRH) with added potency. When present in the bloodstream, it acts on particular cells of the pituitary gland called gonadotropes. Histrelin stimulates these cells to release luteinizing hormone and follicle-stimulating hormone. Thus it is considered a gonadotropin-releasing hormone agonist or GnRH agonist.

Medical uses
Histrelin is used to treat hormone-sensitive cancers of the prostate in men and uterine fibroids in women. In addition, histrelin has been proven to be highly effective in treating central precocious puberty in children.

It is available as a daily intramuscular injection. 

Histrelin is also available in a 12-month subcutaneous implant (Vantas) for the palliative treatment of advanced prostate cancer, since 2005 in the US, and since Jan 2010 in the UK.

A 12-month subcutaneous implant (Supprelin LA) for central precocious puberty (CPP) was approved on May 3, 2007 by the U.S. Food and Drug Administration.

Histrelin can be part of the primary care protocol in transgender children/youth, which is an off-label use in the USA and the UK, and is used in suppressing cis-sex puberty, until the patient is ready to begin cross-sex hormonal therapy. It is also sometimes prescribed to transgender adults who benefit from having their sex hormone production halted.

Side effects
Side effects are mainly due to low testosterone levels and include headache, hot flashes, reduced libido, and erectile dysfunction.

Pharmacology
In a process known as downregulation, daily stimulation of pituitary gonadotropes causes them to become desensitized to the effects of histrelin. As a consequence, levels of luteinizing hormone (LH) and follicle-stimulating hormone (FSH) fall after a short period of time. From that point forward, as long as histrelin is administered, the levels of LH and FSH in the blood remain low.

This prolonged lowering of LH and FSH levels is the rationale for therapy using GnRH agonists. Since LH and FSH stimulate the gonads to produce estrogens and androgens in females and males respectively, histrelin can effectively be used to decrease the sex steroids in the blood of patients.

See also 
 Gonadotropin-releasing hormone receptor § Agonists

References

External links 
 Central Precocious Puberty 

GnRH agonists
Peptides
Puberty blockers